Georgetown Township is a township in Vermilion County, Illinois, USA.  As of the 2010 census, its population was 7,901 and it contained 3,573 housing units.

Geography

Cities and towns
 Belgium (south quarter)
 Georgetown
 Westville (vast majority)

Extinct towns
 Busenville
 Himrod
 Kellyville
 Midway
 Milton
 Steelton
 Unionville

Adjacent townships
 Danville Township (north)
 McKendree Township (east)
 Love Township (southeast)
 Elwood Township (south)
 Carroll Township (southwest)
 Catlin Township (northwest)

Cemeteries
The township contains seven cemeteries: Dukes, Forest Park, Lithuanian, Pleasant Mound, Saints Peter and Paul, Sandusky and Searl.

Major highways
  U.S. Route 150
  Illinois State Route 1

Demographics

References
 U.S. Board on Geographic Names (GNIS)
 United States Census Bureau cartographic boundary files

External links
 US-Counties.com
 City-Data.com
 Illinois State Archives

Townships in Vermilion County, Illinois
Townships in Illinois